John Alan Edward Mulgan  (31 December 1911 – 26 April 1945) was a New Zealand writer, journalist and editor, and the elder son of journalist and writer Alan Mulgan. His influence on New Zealand literature and identity grew in the years after his death. He is best known for his novel Man Alone (1939).

Life

Gifted both academically and athletically, his New Zealand secondary education was at Wellington College (1925–1927) and Auckland Grammar School (1927–1929). Mulgan studied at Auckland University College (1930–1932), before attending Merton College, Oxford from November 1933. He was awarded a first in English in 1935, and in July 1935 took up a position at the Clarendon Press.

Mulgan held leftish political views and was alarmed by the rise of fascism in Europe and the response of the British government to it. In 1936, he was an observer for the New Zealand government at the League of Nations in Geneva. During this time, he wrote a series of articles on foreign affairs, titled "Behind the Cables", for the Auckland Star newspaper.

His view that war in Europe was inevitable led Mulgan to join the Territorial Army in 1938, and he was made second lieutenant in an infantry regiment.
Posted to the Middle East in 1942, Mulgan was promoted to major and made second-in-command of his regiment. He saw action at El Alamein and fought alongside the New Zealand Expeditionary Force. He was impressed by the calibre of his compatriots and found meeting New Zealanders after being in England for so long to be a kind of "homecoming". He left the Royal West Kents Regiment after reporting his last Colonel as quite incompetent.

In 1943, Mulgan joined the Special Operations Executive and was sent to Greece to coordinate guerilla action against the German forces. He was awarded the Military Cross for his actions. After the German withdrawal in 1944, Mulgan oversaw British compensation to Greek families who had helped the Allied forces.

In the evening of Anzac Day 1945, Mulgan intentionally took an overdose of morphine. Speculation continues as to why he committed suicide. He is buried at Heliopolis military cemetery in Cairo. Mulgan was survived by his wife Gabrielle (married 1937) and son Richard (born 1940).

Published works

 Poems of Freedom (editor, London, Victor Gollancz, 1938)
 The Concise Oxford Dictionary of English Literature by Sir Paul Harvey (abridged and edited, Oxford, Clarendon Press, 1939)
 The Emigrants: Early Travellers to the Antipodes (with Hector Bolitho, London, Selwyn and Blount, 1939)
 Man Alone (London, Selwyn and Blount, 1939)
 Report on Experience (London, Oxford University Press, 1947)
 Introduction to English Literature (with D. M. Davin, Oxford, Clarendon Press, 1947)
 A Good Mail: Letters of John Mulgan: edited by Peter Whiteford (Wellington, Victoria University Press, 2011)

References

External links
 profile on the New Zealand Book Council website
 entry in the Dictionary of New Zealand Biography
 entry in the Encyclopaedia of New Zealand, 1966
Report on Experience

1911 births
1945 deaths
New Zealand military personnel of World War II
New Zealand military personnel who committed suicide
New Zealand recipients of the Military Cross
People educated at Auckland Grammar School
People educated at Wellington College (New Zealand)
Alumni of Merton College, Oxford
University of Auckland alumni
20th-century New Zealand journalists
Drug-related suicides
Queen's Own Royal West Kent Regiment officers
Special Operations Executive personnel
1945 suicides